Fayette County is a county located in the U.S. state of Iowa. As of the 2020 census, the population was 19,509. The county seat is West Union.

History
Fayette County was founded on December 21, 1837, as a part of Wisconsin Territory. It was named after Gilbert du Motier, marquis de La Fayette, a French general and politician, who came to America in 1777 to fight in the Revolutionary War, and who was named Major General of the Continental Army. The county was formed as part of a large reorganization of Dubuque County, which at that time comprised most of the northern half of Iowa, Minnesota, and parts of the Dakotas. Fayette County was granted the Minnesota and Dakotas territory on that date. It became part of Iowa Territory when it was formed on July 4, 1838. Fayette County's size was drastically reduced into land that was part of the modern state of Iowa in 1843, then further split in 1847 after Iowa had achieved statehood. The county was organized in 1850.

Geography

Major highways
 U.S. Highway 18
 Iowa Highway 3
 Iowa Highway 56
 Iowa Highway 93
 Iowa Highway 150
 Iowa Highway 187
 Iowa Highway 281

Adjacent counties

Allamakee County (northeast)
Black Hawk County (southwest)
Buchanan County (south)
Bremer County (west)
Chickasaw County (northwest)
Clayton County (east)
Delaware County (southeast)
Winneshiek County (north)

Demographics

2020 census
There were 9,298 housing units of which 8,174 were occupied.

2010 census
There were 9,558 housing units, of which 8,634 were occupied.

2000 census
	
As of the census of 2000, there were 22,008 people, 8,778 households, and 5,951 families residing in the county.  The population density was 30 people per square mile (12/km2).  There were 9,505 housing units at an average density of 13 per square mile (5/km2).  The racial makeup of the county was 97.71% White, 0.53% Black or African American, 0.13% Native American, 0.40% Asian, 0.03% Pacific Islander, 0.43% from other races, and 0.77% from two or more races.  1.50% of the population were Hispanic or Latino of any race.

There were 8,778 households, out of which 30.40% had children under the age of 18 living with them, 56.80% were married couples living together, 7.40% had a female householder with no husband present, and 32.20% were non-families. 28.20% of all households were made up of individuals, and 15.00% had someone living alone who was 65 years of age or older.  The average household size was 2.41 and the average family size was 2.96.

In the county, the population was spread out, with 25.00% under the age of 18, 8.60% from 18 to 24, 24.90% from 25 to 44, 22.40% from 45 to 64, and 19.00% who were 65 years of age or older.  The median age was 39 years. For every 100 females there were 97.50 males.  For every 100 females age 18 and over, there were 95.10 males.

The median income for a household in the county was $32,453, and the median income for a family was $39,960. Males had a median income of $27,493 versus $20,099 for females. The per capita income for the county was $17,271.  About 8.20% of families and 10.80% of the population were below the poverty line, including 12.30% of those under age 18 and 12.00% of those age 65 or over.

Communities

Cities

Arlington
Clermont
Elgin
Fayette
Fairbank
Hawkeye
Maynard
Oelwein
Randalia
St. Lucas
Stanley
Wadena
Waucoma
West Union
Westgate

Unincorporated communities
Alpha
Donnan
Oran
Richfield

Townships
Fayette County is divided into twenty townships:

 Auburn
 Banks
 Bethel
 Center
 Clermont
 Dover
 Eden
 Fairfield
 Fremont
 Harlan
 Illyria
 Jefferson
 Oran
 Pleasant Valley
 Putnam
 Scott
 Smithfield
 Union
 Westfield
 Windsor

Population ranking
The population ranking of the following table is based on the 2020 census of Fayette County.

† county seat

Politics

See also

National Register of Historic Places listings in Fayette County, Iowa

References

External links

 County website
 Fayette County Economic Development
 Fayette County Health and Demographic Data

 
1837 establishments in Wisconsin Territory
Populated places established in 1837